El precio de un hombre (English title:The Bounty Killer) is a Mexican telenovela produced by Televisa and transmitted by Telesistema Mexicano in 1970.

Cast 
Guillermo Aguilar
Augusto Benedico
Carlos Bracho
Mario Cid
Carmen Cortés

References

External links 

Mexican telenovelas
1970 telenovelas
Televisa telenovelas
Spanish-language telenovelas
1970 Mexican television series debuts
1970 Mexican television series endings